The Jewish House (Casa del Judío) is located in the heart of the Jewish quarter of Toledo, in Castile-La Mancha, Spain. It was built in the 14th and 15th centuries. The two areas of main interest are the courtyard, which retains a multitude of yeserias (carved plasterwork), and above all, the basement that was possibly a Jewish liturgical bath or mikveh, whose function was spiritual purification and preparation for some important event in the life of a Jew.  During restorations of adjacent rooms, Almagra style hydraulic plastering has been uncovered, as well as a cistern, all of which support the theory about its use.

Another element of great relevance for its archaeological study is a piece of wood used as a lintel for access to the basement, where it can observe the work of carving with floral motifs, based on tympanums and scrolls, accompanying an epigraphic repertoire whose transcription says: "Thanks I give you, because you have answered my prayers"; Text related to verses 21 of Psalm 18: "Here is the door of Yahveh, through which the righteous come in." 21 "thanks I give you, because you have answered my prayers, and it has been my salvation", which welcomes all those who are faithful and pure at the interior of the house.

References

External links
The Jewish House in toledo-turismo.com (in English)
The Jewish House in ciudaddelastresculturastoledo.blogspot.com (in Spanish)

Jewish communities
Jews and Judaism in Toledo, Spain
Buildings and structures completed in the 15th century
Buildings and structures in Toledo, Spain